Dean Brody is the self-titled debut album of Canadian country music singer, Dean Brody. It was released on April 28, 2009 via Broken Bow Records under the production of Matt Rovey. The album includes the single "Brothers", his only country hit in the United States. Brody wrote or co-wrote nine of the album's eleven songs.

Critical reception

Chris Neal of Country Weekly magazine gave the album a three-and-a-half star rating out of five. He said that the album contained well-written lyrics with a strong sense of individuality. He also said that Brody "doesn't reinvent current Music Row formulas — he just does them a little smarter and sharper than some do."

Matt Bjorke of Roughstock called the album a "fantastic collection of traditionalist modern country music," that wasn't the hit it should have been. He noted that only one single, the hit "Brothers" was the only track to make it to the charts in the U.S. While Brody's debut album was clearly not a breakout in the United States, it fared better in the artist's homeland of Canada where three singles earned top 10 rankings. The three hit singles were, "Brothers," "Dirt Road Scholar" and "Undone."

The single "Brothers" won the Canadian Country Music Association "Song of the Year" for 2009. "Dirt Road Scholar" was 2009's most-played music video for a new artist in Canada.

Track listing

Personnel
 Eddie Bayers – drums
 Dean Brody – lead vocals, acoustic guitar
 Jim "Moose" Brown – piano, keyboards, Hammond organ, Wurlitzer electric piano
 Melodie Crittenden – background vocals
 Stuart Duncan – fiddle, mandolin
 Paul Franklin – steel guitar
 Kenny Greenberg – electric guitar
 B. James Lowry – acoustic guitar
 Brent Mason – electric guitar
 Jeff Middleton – banjo
 James Mitchell – electric guitar
 Phillip Moore – acoustic guitar, electric guitar, slide guitar
 John Wesley Ryles – background vocals
 Scotty Sanders – Dobro
 Russell Terrell – background vocals
 Rhonda Vincent – background vocals
 Bruce Watkins – acoustic guitar, banjo
 Lonnie Wilson – drums
 Glenn Worf – bass guitar

Chart performance

Album

Singles

References

2009 debut albums
BBR Music Group albums
Dean Brody albums